Tanguyeh-ye Sofla (also Romanized as Tangūyeh-ye Soflá; also known as Tankūīyeh-ye Soflá and  Tangūyeh-ye Pāeen) is a village in Zakharuiyeh Rural District, Efzar District, Qir and Karzin County, Fars Province, Iran. At the 2006 census, its population was 169, in 32 families.

References 

Populated places in Qir and Karzin County